Aeroporto is a railway station in Bari, Italy, which serves Bari Karol Wojtyła Airport. The two platforms are connected to the terminal by an underground walkway. The station opened on 20 July 2013 and the train services are operated by Ferrotramviaria.

Train services
The station is served by the following service(s):

Bari Metropolitan services (FR2) Barletta - Andria - Bitonto - Aeroporto - Bari
Bari Metropolitan services (FM2) Bitonto - Aeroporto - Bari

References

Railway stations opened in 2013
Railway stations in Apulia
Buildings and structures in the Province of Bari
Airport railway stations in Italy